Saint-Nicolas is a district within Les Chutes-de-la-Chaudière-Ouest borough of the city of Lévis, Quebec, Canada on the St. Lawrence River. Prior to 2002, it was an independent municipality.

History
The history of Saint-Nicolas goes back to 1694.  It is one of the oldest parishes in Canada. Its heritage is a testimony to its long history.

The city was named in honour of Nicolas de Myre.

In 2002, following many merges with other municipalities, Saint-Nicolas was one of nine
cities merged with Lévis.

Statistics

According to the Canada 2006 Census:

Population: 18,437
% Change (2001–2006): +10.8
Dwellings: 7,024
Area (km2): 95.09 km2
Density (persons per km2): 193.9

Neighbourhoods in Lévis, Quebec
Former municipalities in Quebec
Populated places disestablished in 2002
Canada geography articles needing translation from French Wikipedia